Services and Advocacy for Gay, Lesbian, Bisexual, and Transgender Elders (SAGE) is America's oldest and largest non-profit organization dedicated to improving the lives of lesbian, gay, bisexual and transgender (LGBT) older adults, focusing on the issue of LGBT aging.  According to its mission statement, "SAGE leads in addressing issues related to lesbian, gay, bisexual, transgender, queer and questioning and other self-identifying members of the community (LGBTQ+) aging. In partnership with its constituents and allies, SAGE works to achieve a high quality of life for LGBTQ+ older people, supports and advocates for their rights, fosters a greater understanding of aging in all communities, and promotes positive images of LGBTQ+ life in later years." SAGE is a 501(c)(3) organization that focuses on advocacy on the local and federal levels, as well as activities, groups and programs that encourage LGBTQ+ older adults to stay connected with each other and the community.

Leadership
SAGE's leadership includes Chief Executive Officer, Michael Adams, former Director of Education and Public Affairs for Lambda Legal.  SAGE's work is supported by a board of directors located throughout the U.S.  The current board chairs are Ruth Eisenberg and Kevin Williams.

History
Incorporated by lesbian and gay activists and aging service professionals in 1978 as Senior Action in a Gay Environment, SAGE (now Services & Advocacy for LGBT Elders) is primarily located in New York City and has partner organizations all over the United States of America and Puerto Rico. SAGE also supports LGBTI older people in Costa Rica, El Salvador, Nepal, and the Philippines. SAGE works with LGBTQ+ older adults and aging service providers to address and overcome the challenges of discrimination in older adult service settings.

SAGE is responsible for the nation's first Friendly Visiting program for frail and homebound LGBT older adults; the country's first support group for LGBT older adults with HIV; the nation's first program dedicated to caregiving services for LGBT older adults; the nation's first LGBT Senior Drop-In Center and the creation of the first national conferences devoted to LGBT aging concerns.

In 2010, SAGE became the recipient of a three-year, $900,000 grant from the Department of Health and Human Services and the Administration on Aging to create the nation's only national resource center on LGBT aging. Edie Windsor was a vocal advocate for SAGE and former board member.

Programs
SAGE Centers
With funding from the New York City Council and the city's Department for the Aging (DFTA), SAGE opened the nation's first municipally funded senior center in January 2012. Expanded funding in 2014 allowed the opening of new centers in Brooklyn (with GRIOT Circle) and the Bronx, and expanded facilities in Harlem. There is also a full-time SAGE employee providing older adult programming at the Pride Center of Staten Island.

Older Adults
SAGE's Clinical & Social Services program offers individual and group counseling and comprehensive case management.

Caregivers
SAGE's Caregiver program provides a wide range of services for caregivers and care recipients.  SAGECAP (SAGE Caring And Preparing) was the focus of a New York citywide ad campaign in 2010 which won a GLAAD Media Award in Advertising for "Outstanding Social Marketing Campaign".

SAGE Harlem
The SAGE Harlem Neighborhood Program is considered a NORC (Naturally Occurring Retirement Community) based not on geography but on affinity.  SAGE Harlem provides LGBT older adults in Harlem and allies opportunities for recreation and socializing, social services and support, educational opportunities and partners with neighborhood CBOs and senior centers to raise visibility and improve the quality of services. SAGE Harlem is located in the Oberia D. Dempsey Multi-Service Center at 127 West 127th Street in Harlem (and was formerly in the historic Hotel Theresa in New York City) and is part of New York City Department for the Aging blueprint for increasing the city’s livability for older New Yorkers.

Advocacy & Policy
SAGE is working with its office in Washington, D.C., and national partners on legislation pertaining to the reauthorization of the Older Americans Act and Medicaid in 2011.

SAGE STORY
SAGE STORY, commenced in 2014, is a national digital storytelling program for LGBT elders. it was created to collect stories on the ways in which discrimination has affected LGBT older people. The initiative was limited at first to sites in North Carolina and Pennsylvania.  However, it fast grew beyond its initial tight focus, and it is now national. SAGE STORY draws on the unique life experiences of LGBT elders to offer fresh perspectives on aging, long-term care and LGBT rights. It is made possible through the support of AARP Foundation and the Ford Foundation.

SAGE STORY offers LGBT elders four ways to pass on their experiences: Through photographs, podcasts, videos, and written articles.

Publications
SAGE has been involved in the following publications which have been helpful in garnering media coverage about the plight of LGBT older adults:

 Improving the Lives of LGBT Older Adults
 Outing Age 2010: Public Policy Issues Affecting Lesbian, Gay, Bisexual and Transgender (LGBT) Elders
 ''Out & Visible: The Experiences and Attitudes of LGBT Older Adults, Ages 45–75"

References 

 Breaking the Silence: LGBT Seniors Making Great Strides; May 2011; NYC Senior Care
 The Silent Population: Mounting Issues Facing a Growing LGBT Senior Population; May 2011; NYC Senior Care

External links 

 Services & Advocacy for BT Elders (SAGE) — official website
 National Resource Center on LGBT Aging — sister website

LGBT and ageing
LGBT charities
LGBT health organizations in the United States
Medical and health organizations based in New York (state)
Seniors' organizations
LGBT organizations based in New York City
1979 in LGBT history
1979 establishments in New York City
Organizations established in 1979